Elections to Larne Borough Council were held on 5 May 2011 on the same day as the other Northern Irish local government elections. The election used three district electoral areas to elect a total of 15 councillors.

Election results

Note: "Votes" are the first preference votes.

Districts summary

|- class="unsortable" align="centre"
!rowspan=2 align="left"|Ward
! % 
!Cllrs
! % 
!Cllrs
! %
!Cllrs
! %
!Cllrs
! % 
!Cllrs
! % 
!Cllrs
! %
!Cllrs
!rowspan=2|TotalCllrs
|- class="unsortable" align="center"
!colspan=2 bgcolor="" | DUP
!colspan=2 bgcolor="" | UUP
!colspan=2 bgcolor="" | Alliance
!colspan=2 bgcolor="" | TUV
!colspan=2 bgcolor="" | Sinn Féin
!colspan=2 bgcolor="" | SDLP
!colspan=2 bgcolor="white"| Others
|-
|align="left"|Coast Road
|bgcolor="#D46A4C"|24.2
|bgcolor="#D46A4C"|1
|17.2
|1
|10.3
|1
|3.2
|0
|18.5
|1
|9.9
|0
|16.7
|1
|5
|-
|align="left"|Larne Lough
|bgcolor="#D46A4C"|44.0
|bgcolor="#D46A4C"|2
|28.8
|2
|20.7
|1
|6.6
|0
|0.0
|0
|0.0
|0
|0.0
|0
|5
|-
|align="left"|Larne Town
|bgcolor="#D46A4C"|23.1
|bgcolor="#D46A4C"|1
|5.0
|0
|11.8
|1
|13.6
|1
|5.3
|0
|11.2
|1
|30.0
|1
|5
|-
|- class="unsortable" class="sortbottom" style="background:#C9C9C9"
|align="left"| Total
|32.0
|4
|18.6
|3
|15.0
|3
|7.4
|1
|7.3
|1
|6.2
|1
|13.5
|2
|15
|-
|}

Districts results

Coast Road

2005: 2 x DUP, 1 x UUP, 1 x SDLP, 1 x Alliance
2011: 1 x DUP, 1 x Sinn Féin, 1 x UUP, 1 x Alliance, 1 x Independent
2005-2011 Change: Sinn Féin and Independent gain from SDLP and DUP

Larne Lough

2005: 2 x DUP, 2 x UUP, 1 x Alliance
2011: 2 x DUP, 2 x UUP, 1 x Alliance
2005-2011 Change: No change

Larne Town

2005: 2 x Independent, 1 x DUP, 1 x SDLP, 1 x UUP
2011: 1 x DUP, 1 x TUV, 1 x Alliance, 1 x SDLP, 1 x Independent
2005-2011 Change: TUV and Alliance gain from UUP and Independent

References

Larne Borough Council elections
Larne